Cercospora fusimaculans is a fungal plant pathogen.

References

fusimaculans
Fungal plant pathogens and diseases